Karel Mark Chichon  (born 30 April 1971) is a British-Gibraltarian orchestra conductor.

Biography 
Born in London, Chichon studied at the Royal Academy of Music in London, and at the Hochschule für Musik in Vienna under Leopold Hager. Chichon and businessman Ian Angus co-founded the Gibraltar Philharmonic Society in the year 1998.  Chichon continues to serve as the society's artistic director.

Career 
Chichon was chief conductor of the Graz Symphony Orchestra from 2006 to 2009.  He served as chief conductor and artistic director of the Latvian National Symphony Orchestra from 2009 to 2012.  Chichon became chief conductor of the Deutsche Radio Philharmonie Saarbrücken Kaiserslautern (DRP) in September 2011.  In March 2013, his initial contract was extended through the 2016–2017 season.  In March 2015, the orchestra and Chichon mutually announced the scheduled conclusion of his DRP tenure at the end of the 2016–2017 season.  In the US, Chichon made his Metropolitan Opera conducting debut in February 2016 with performances of Madama Butterfly, which included one cinema relay. In May 2017, he was appointed chief conductor and artistic director of the Orquesta Filarmónica de Gran Canaria, effective with the 2017–2018 season. In May 2018 his contract has been renewed and he will continue to guide the artistic destiny of the Orquesta Filarmonica de Gran Canaria as its Chief Conductor and Artistic Director until the year 2023.

Discography 
His commercial recordings include two albums for Deutsche Grammophon, Meditation and Habanera, both of which feature his wife Elīna Garanča. In 2014 he recorded Dvořák's Symphony No. 1 with the DRP orchestra for the Hänssler Classic label, the first of a projected set of all nine of Dvořák's symphonies.

Chichon was appointed Officer of the Order of the British Empire (OBE) in the 2012 Birthday Honours for services to music and culture in Gibraltar.  In March 2016, he was named a Fellow of the Royal Academy of Music.

Personal life 
Chichon and Elina Garanča have two daughters, Catherine Louise Chichon and Cristina Sophie Chichon, who in turn are granddaughters to Harry Chichon and Leonor Chichon.

References

External links
 Official website of Karel Mark Chichon
 Askonas Holt agency page on Karel Mark Chichon
 Deutschen Radio Philharmonie Saarbrücken Kaiserslautern German-language page on Chichon

1971 births
Living people
Gibraltarian conductors (music)
Alumni of the Royal Academy of Music
Officers of the Order of the British Empire
21st-century British conductors (music)